Kings Peak is a mountain located on Vancouver Island in British Columbia, Canada.

It is named after James and Michael King, late 19th century explorers who led an expedition into the region circa 1910.

Kings Peak is close to Highway 28 along the Elk River.  It is one of the most frequented mountains on Vancouver Island.

References

Sources

External links
 Strathcona Provincial Park from British Columbia Ministry of Environment website.

Two-thousanders of British Columbia
Vancouver Island Ranges
Nootka Land District